Crescent Valley is a census-designated place (CDP) in Eureka County, Nevada, United States, directly off Nevada State Route 306. It is the site of Crescent Valley Elementary School, Crescent Valley Fair Grounds, and Crescent Valley Community Park. The census-designated place (CDP) of Crescent Valley had a population of 483 as of the 2020 census.

Crescent Valley is part of the Elko Micropolitan Statistical Area.

History
A post office had been in operation at Crescent Valley since 1963, closing in 2008.  A small store at the SE corner of 2nd street and SR306 has one of the only “Village Post Offices” in the state of Nevada. Postal boxes to receive mail were installed at the Fairgrounds. Mail is delivered from the Post Office in Carlin, NV by auto.

The community takes its name from the valley in which it is located, which in turn was named on account of its crescent shape.

Education
While the only school in town is an elementary school, students who attend middle high school are bussed to the Battle Mountain Junior and Senior High Schools in Battle Mountain. Crescent Valley enjoys an Education Index that is above the Nevada state average.

Crescent Valley  has a public library, a branch of the Elko-Lander-Eureka County Library System.

Geography
The town itself is about 1 mile in length and width with houses and streets on the outskirts reaching as far as 2 miles south and .6 miles north.

Demographics

Recreation and holidays

The park in Crescent Valley is a small area consisting of two pavilions, a large area for picnicking complete with barbecues, a bathroom, a baseball field for the CVES youth baseball teams, a playground, a basketball court, and a horseshoe tossing area. The dirt hills and ditches on the outskirts of Crescent Valley are the perfect type of terrain to enjoy some dirt biking, which is the common interest between the younger kids and teens.

The town celebrates all holidays at the fairgrounds, also known as the community center, including "Founder's Day" near the end of June. Founders Day is the celebration of the town itself with games such as horseshoe tossing near the park and pig chasing at the fairgrounds. Other holidays usually are celebrated by special events and dinners at the fairgrounds. Easter is celebrated with an Easter egg hunt and a raffle for prizes at The Ranch House bar and grill on the north side of town. Trick-or-treaters can be found all throughout the town on Halloween, and every year a special "Christmas Carol" Hayride is organized in December.

Environment
According to the 2010 Air Pollution Index, Crescent Valley's air pollution is below the national average.

See also
 List of census-designated places in Nevada

References

External links

 Eureka County website
 Crescent Valley Branch Library

Census-designated places in Nevada
Census-designated places in Eureka County, Nevada
Elko, Nevada micropolitan area